Plácido Domingo has made hundreds of opera performances, music albums, and concert recordings throughout his career as an operatic tenor. From his first operatic leading role as Alfredo in La traviata in 1961, his major debuts continued in swift succession: Tosca at the Hamburg State Opera and Don Carlos at the Vienna State Opera in 1967; Adriana Lecouvreur at the Metropolitan Opera, Turandot in Verona Arena and La bohème in San Francisco in 1969; La Gioconda in 1970; Tosca in Royal Opera House, Covent Garden in 1971; La bohème at the Bavarian State Opera in 1972; Il trovatore at the Paris Opéra in 1973 and Don Carlo at the Salzburg Festival in 1975, Parsifal in 1992 at the Bayreuth Festival; and the list continues until today; the same role is often recorded more than once.

Other than full-length opera performance recordings, Domingo has also made many music albums, recording opera arias, live opera performances and concerts, and crossover songs in solo and duet. His albums have simultaneously appeared on Billboard charts of best-selling classical and crossover recordings; contributing to many gold and platinum records and nine Grammy awards.

Below are the lists of his recordings in full-length opera performances, music albums and compilation albums (including concerts) with other singers. However, the lists cannot be used to reflect his total number of performances because some of his operas and concerts have never been recorded and commercialized out of the stage.

Albums

Studio albums
Note: "Cat:" is short for catalogue number by the label company.

Live albums

Concerts and operatic selections

Compilation albums
This section contains a partial list of compilation albums with Domingo. It includes solely re-released material, unless otherwise noted. Previously unreleased selections from live performances are included under Live recordings: Concerts and operatic selections above.

Solo albums and collaborations

Recordings of complete roles
This section includes recordings of Domingo performing complete roles in operas, zarzuelas, musicals, and vocal symphonic works.

Studio recordings

Live recordings

Singles

Soundtracks
Complete opera film soundtracks are included above under Recordings of complete roles.

Filmography

Movies

Videos

Filmed stage roles

See also
 Grammy Award for Best Opera Recording
 The Three Tenors

Notes

External links
Most references are based from the list below:
 List of Plácido Domingo recordings from Amazon.com
 Plácido Domingo recordings from The MET
 List of Plácido Domingo recordings from Plácido Domingo official website
 Domingo discography from Weblaopera site
 List from Deutsche Grammophon website
 Placido Domingo Discography from CDuniverse.com
 List of recordings from iclassics.com
 AllMusic Discography (See also AllMusic Awards: Billboard Albums for charting information)

Classical music discographies
Opera singer discographies
Discographies of Spanish artists
Discography